Beata Nandjala Naigambo (born 11 March 1980 in Windhoek, Khomas Region) is a Namibian long-distance runner who specializes in the marathon. Her personal best time is 2:27:28, set at the Hamburg Marathon in April 2015.

She competed at the 2008 Summer Olympics, where she finished 28th out of 81 total participants in the Women's marathon.

At the 2012 Summer Olympics she finished 38th out of 107 finishers with a time of 2:31:16.

Achievements

References

External links

marathoninfo

1980 births
Living people
People from Ohangwena Region
Namibian female long-distance runners
Namibian female marathon runners
Olympic athletes of Namibia
Athletes (track and field) at the 2008 Summer Olympics
Athletes (track and field) at the 2012 Summer Olympics
Athletes (track and field) at the 2016 Summer Olympics
Commonwealth Games competitors for Namibia
Athletes (track and field) at the 2002 Commonwealth Games
Athletes (track and field) at the 2006 Commonwealth Games
Athletes (track and field) at the 2010 Commonwealth Games
Athletes (track and field) at the 2014 Commonwealth Games
World Athletics Championships athletes for Namibia
Athletes (track and field) at the 2019 African Games
African Games competitors for Namibia